The $64,000 Question was an American game show broadcast in primetime on CBS-TV from 1955 to 1958, which became embroiled in the 1950s quiz show scandals. Contestants answered general knowledge questions, earning money which doubled as the questions became more difficult. The final question had a top prize of $64,000, hence the "$64,000 Question" in the show's title.

The $64,000 Challenge (1956–1958) was its spin-off show, where contestants played against winners of at least $8,000 on The $64,000 Question.

Origins

The $64,000 Question was largely inspired by the earlier CBS and NBC radio program Take It or Leave It, which ran on CBS radio from 1940 to 1947, and then on NBC radio from 1947 to 1952. After 1950, the show was renamed The $64 Question. The format of the show remained largely the same through its 12-year run; a contestant was asked a series of progressively more difficult questions which began at $1 and ended at a top prize of $64.

Show creation
The $64,000 Question was created by Louis G. Cowan, formerly known for radio's Quiz Kids and the television series Stop the Music and Down You Go. Cowan drew the inspiration for the name from Take It or Leave It, and its $64 top prize offering. He decided to expand the figure to $64,000 for the new television program.

Finally, Cowan convinced Revlon. The key: Revlon founder and chieftain Charles Revson knew top competitor Hazel Bishop had fattened its sales through sponsoring the popular This Is Your Life, and he wanted a piece of that action if he could have it. Revlon first signed a deal to sponsor Cowan's brainchild for 13 weeks with the right to withdraw when they expired.

The $64,000 Question premiered June 7, 1955 on CBS-TV, sponsored by cosmetics maker Revlon and originating from the start live from CBS-TV Studio 52 in New York (later the disco-theater Studio 54).

To increase the show's drama and suspense, and because radio host Phil Baker had bombed earlier in the decade with his lone television effort Who's Whose, it was decided to use an actor rather than a broadcaster as the host. Television and film actor Hal March, familiar to TV viewers as a supporting regular on The George Burns and Gracie Allen Show and My Friend Irma, found instant fame as the quiz show's host, and Lynn Dollar stood nearby as his assistant. Author and TV panelist Dr. Bergen Evans was the show's expert authority, and actress Wendy Barrie did the "Living Lipstick" commercials. To capitalize on the initial television success, the show was also simulcast for two months on CBS Radio where it was heard from October 4, 1955 to November 29, 1955.

Gameplay
Contestants first chose a subject category (such as "Boxing", "Lincoln", "Jazz" or "Football") from the Category Board. Although this board was a large part of the set, it was seen only briefly, evidently to conceal the fact that categories were sometimes hastily added to match a new contestant's subject. The contestant was then asked questions only in the chosen category, earning money which doubled ($64, $128, $256, $512; then $1,000, $2,000, $4,000, $8,000, $16,000, $32,000, and finally $64,000) as the questions became more difficult. At the $4,000 level, a contestant returned each week for only one question per week. The contestant could quit at any time and retire with their money, but until they won $512, they lost all winnings for answering a question incorrectly. Missing a $1,000, $2,000, or $4,000 question left the contestant with $512. If a contestant missed a question after winning $4,000 they received a consolation prize of a new Cadillac. Starting with the $8,000 question, the contestant was placed in the Revlon "isolation booth", where they could hear nothing but the host's words. As long as the contestant kept answering correctly, they stayed on the show until they had won $64,000.

Public reception
Almost immediately, The $64,000 Question beat every other program on Tuesday nights in ratings. Broadcast historian Robert Metz, in CBS: Reflections in a Bloodshot Eye, claimed U.S. President Dwight D. Eisenhower himself did not want to be disturbed while the show was on and that the nation's crime rate, movie theater, and restaurant patronage dropped dramatically when the show aired. It earned the #1 rating spot for the 1955–56 season, holding the distinction of being the only television show to knock I Love Lucy out of the #1 spot, and finished at #4 in the 1956–57 season and #20 in 1957–58. Among its imitators or inspirations were The Big Surprise, Tic-Tac-Dough, and Twenty-One.

The $64,000 Challenge
Not only did Charles Revson not exercise his withdrawal right, but he wanted another way to take advantage of Questions swollen audience. April 8, 1956 saw the debut of The $64,000 Challenge (initially co-sponsored by Revlon and Lorillard Tobacco Company's Kent cigarettes), hosted through August 26 by future children's television star Sonny Fox and then, for the remainder of the show's life, Ralph Story.

It pitted contestants against winners of at least $8,000 on The $64,000 Question in a new, continuing game where they could win another $64,000. The contestants took turns answering questions from the same category starting at the $1,000 level. If they each answered a question correctly, they advanced to the $2,000 level. Starting at the $4,000 level, both contestants answered the same question while each standing in their own isolation booth. If, at any given level, a contestant answered correctly with the other contestant missing a question, the winning contestant either kept the money and faced a new player, or continued playing against the same opponent at the next money level.

In time, the sister show came to include various celebrities, including bandleader Xavier Cugat and child star Patty Duke, as well as former Question champions.

The J. Fred & Leslie W. MacDonald Collection of the Library of Congress contains one kinescoped episode featuring Capt. Richard McCutchen as a contestant, broadcast July 1, 1956.

Everyday celebrities
Question contestants sometimes became celebrities themselves for a short while, including 11-year-old Robert Strom (who won $192,000, worth $ million today) and Teddy Nadler ($252,000 across both shows, worth $ million today), the two biggest winners in the show's history. Other such newly made celebrities included Italian-born Bronx shoemaker Gino Prato, who won $32,000 ($ today) for his encyclopedic knowledge of opera. The longest enduring of these newly made celebrities was psychologist Joyce Brothers. Answering questions about boxing, she became, after McCutchen, the second top winner, and went on to a career providing psychological advice in newspaper columns and TV shows for the next four decades. Another winner, Pennsylvania typist Catherine Kreitzer, read Shakespeare on The Ed Sullivan Show. TV Guide kept a running tally of the money won on the show, which hit $1 million by the end of November 1956 ($ million today).

The American Experience (PBS) episode probing the scandal noted:
"All the big winners became instant celebrities and household names. For the first time, America's heroes were intellectuals or experts–jockey Billy Pearson on art, Marine Captain McCutchen on cooking–every subject from the Bible to baseball. Not only had the contestants become rich overnight, but they were also treated to a whirlwind of publicity tours, awards, endorsements and meetings with dignitaries. Cobbler Gino Prato, whose category was opera, was brought to Italy for a special performance at la Scala and honored by an audience with the Pope. After winning $64,000, spelling whiz Gloria Lockerman, an African American, became a guest speaker at the 1956 Democratic National Convention... Eleven-year-old stock market expert Lenny Ross was asked to open up the New York Stock Exchange".

Merchandising and parodies
One category on the Revlon Category Board was "Jazz", and within months of the premiere Columbia Records issued a 1955 album of various jazz artists under the tie-in title $64,000 Jazz (CL 777, also EP B-777), with the following tracks: "The Shrike" (Pete Rugolo), "Perdido" (J.J. Johnson, Kai Winding), "Laura" (Erroll Garner), "Honeysuckle Rose" (Benny Goodman), "Tawny" (Woody Herman), "One O'Clock Jump" (Harry James), "How Hi the Fi" (Buck Clayton), "I'm Comin', Virginia" (Eddie Condon), "A Fine Romance" (Dave Brubeck, Paul Desmond), "I Let A Song Go Out of My Heart" (Duke Ellington) and "Ain't Misbehavin'" (Louis Armstrong).

Other musical tie-ins included the 1955 song "The $64,000 Question (Do You Love Me)", recorded by Bobby Tuggle (Checker 823), Jackie Brooks (Decca 29684) and the Burton Sisters (RCA Victor 47-6265). "Love Is the $64,000 Question" (1956), which used the show's theme music by Norman F. Leyden with added Fred Ebb lyrics, was recorded by Hal March (Columbia 40684), Karen Chandler (Decca 29881), Jim Lowe (Dot 15456) and Tony Travis (RCA Victor 47-6476).

When the show was revived in 1976 as The $128,000 Question, its theme music and cues were performed (albeit with a new disco-style arrangement for the theme) by Charles Randolph Grean, who released a three-and-a-half-minute single, "The $128,000 Question" (the show's music and cues as an instrumental), with the B-side ("Sentimentale") on the Ranwood label (45rpm release R-1064). For the show's second season, Grean's music package was re-recorded by Guido Basso.

There were numerous parodies of the program, including in the Foghorn Leghorn cartoon "Fox-Terror", Bob and Ray's The 64-Cent Question. The Jack Benny Program featured Hal March as a contestant in an October 20, 1957 spoof with Benny asking the questions. As a gag, Benny actually appeared as a contestant on The $64,000 Question on October 8, 1957, but insisted on walking away with $64 after answering the first question. Hal March finally gave him $64 out of his own pocket.

At the height of its popularity, The $64,000 Question was referenced in the scripts of other CBS shows, usually but not exclusively through punch lines that included references to "the isolation booth" or "reaching the first plateau". Typical of these was spoken by The Honeymooners Ed Norton (Art Carney), who identified three times in a man's life when he wants to be alone, with the third being "when he's in the isolation booth of The $64,000 Question". At least three other Honeymooners episodes referenced Question: In A Woman's Work Is Never Done Ralph proposes to Alice that he go on the show because he's an expert in the "Aggravation" category. In Hello, Mom Norton tells Ralph that his mother-in-law's category on the show would be "Nasty". In The Worry Wart, Ralph advises Alice to become a contestant because she's an expert in the "Everything" category.

Another episode of The Honeymooners, delivered one of the best known Question references – a parody of the show itself, in one of the so-called "Original 39" episodes of the timeless situation comedy. In that episode, blustery bus driver Ralph Kramden becomes a contestant on the fictitious $99,000 Answer. Regarded as one of the Golden Age of Television's best quiz show parodies, the Honeymooners episode depicted Kramden spending a week intensively studying popular songs, only to blow the first question on the subject when he returned to play on the show. The host of the fictitious $99,000 Answer was one Herb Norris, played by former Twenty Questions emcee and future Tic-Tac-Dough host Jay Jackson.

The show has been referenced on other game shows. On the U.S. version of Deal or No Deal, an episode aired January 15, 2007, in which the banker's offer was $64,000. Host Howie Mandel said, "This is the $64,000 question".

In many money trees of most variations of the television series Who Wants to Be a Millionaire?, the amount of $64,000 is often included as the prize money awarded for correctly answering the 11th question.

Scandal and cancellation

In mid-August 1958, while both Question and Challenge had already been announced as part of CBS's fall lineup, the network's quiz show Dotto was cancelled without explanation. A federal investigation was launched by the end of August on the allegation that a Dotto contestant had been given answers in advance. The probe soon included NBC's Twenty-One, and was expected to expand further.

In the first week of September, a contestant of Challenge, Rev. Charles Jackson, came forward to say he had been given answers in advance. On September 13, Lorillard Tobacco Company pulled its sponsorship of the show; this made the previous airing on September 7 the last for Challenge. The $64,000 Challenge was replaced on CBS with "a special news program" on September 14.

The $64,000 Question, which had not yet begun airing for the new season, assumed Challenge's Sunday time slot on September 21. After the federal probe of quiz shows surfaced, quiz shows suffered badly in the Fall 1958 Nielsen ratings. In late October, strong rumors had surfaced that Question was slated for movement to a less desirable time slot, or cancellation. Cancellation was made official after Question's November 2 airing.

The game show ceased operations for good on November 21, 1958.

Scandal
The $64,000 Question was closely monitored by its sponsor's CEO, Revlon's Charles Revson, who often interfered with production, especially attempting to bump contestants he himself disliked, regardless of audience reaction. Revson's brother, Martin, was assigned to oversee production, including heavy discussions of feedback the show received.

According to Question producer Joe Cates, an IBM sorting machine was used to present lower dollar value questions, to give the illusion that the questions were randomly selected – in fact, all of the cards were identical.

Nadler's victory was called into question when he failed a civil service exam in 1960 applying a job for the United States Census Bureau. Producers eventually acknowledged he had been shown questions beforehand but not answers, noting that he already knew the answers beforehand; he was exonerated of wrongdoing.

The most prominent victim may have been the man who initially launched the franchise. Louis Cowan, made CBS Television president as a result of Questions fast success, was forced out of the network as the quiz scandal ramped up, even though it was NBC's quiz shows bearing most of the brunt of the scandal – and even though CBS itself, with a little help from sponsor Colgate-Palmolive, had moved fast in cancelling the popular Dotto at almost the moment it was confirmed that that show had been rigged. Cowan had never been suspected of taking part in any attempt to rig either Question or Challenge; later CBS historians suggested his reputation as an administrative bottleneck may have had as much to do with his firing as his tie to the tainted shows. Cowan may have been a textbook sacrificial lamb, in a bid to preempt any further scandal while the network scrambled to recover, and while president Frank Stanton accepted complete responsibility for any wrongdoing committed under his watch.

Aftermath
By the end of 1959, all first generation big-money quizzes were gone, with single-sponsorship television following and a federal law against fixing television game shows (an amendment to the 1960 Communications Act) coming. Over the course of the early 1960s, the networks wound down their five-figure jackpot game shows; Jackpot Bowling (1959–1961) and Make That Spare (1960–1964), a period on Beat the Clock (1960) when its Bonus Stunt grew in $100 increments past the $10,000 mark until finally being won for $20,100 on September 23, You Bet Your Life (ended 1961) and the more lavish prize offerings on The Nighttime Price Is Right (1957–1964) were the few remaining shows offering large prizes. Only one traditional big-money quiz show, the short-lived ABC quiz 100 Grand (1963), was attempted in the subsequent years; the networks stayed away from awarding five-figure cash jackpots until the premiere of The $10,000 Pyramid and Match Game 73 in 1973. The disappearance of the quiz shows gave rise to television's next big phenomenon–Westerns.

The scandals also resulted in a shift of the balance of power between networks and sponsors. The networks used the scandals to justify taking control of their programs away from sponsors, thereby eliminating any potential future manipulation in prime-time broadcasting, and giving the networks full autonomy over program content.

None of the people directly involved in rigging any of the quiz shows faced any penalty more severe than suspended sentences for perjury before the federal grand jury that probed the scandal, even if many hosts and producers found themselves frozen out of television for many years. One Question contestant, Doll Goostree, sued both CBS and the producers in a bid to recoup $4,000 she said she might have won if her match of Question hadn't been rigged. Neither Goostree nor any other quiz contestant who similarly sued won their cases.Louis Cowan – In addition to Quiz Kids (1949–1951) and Stop the Music (1949–52, 1954–56), Cowan also created Down You Go (1951–1956) and the short-lived Ask Me Another (1952). Cowan briefly served as CBS Television Network president before leaving in the wake of the quiz show scandals. He later joined the faculty of the Columbia University school of journalism. He and his wife Polly were killed in an apartment fire in New York City in 1976. Lou Cowan's son Geoffrey later produced brief revivals of Quiz Kids in the 1970s, 1980s, and 1990s and is currently dean of the University of Southern California Annenberg School for Communication.Hal March – The former comic actor who became an overnight star on Question continued to appear as an actor in television and movies throughout the 1950s and 1960s. Shortly after he signed on as host of It's Your Bet in 1969, he was diagnosed with lung cancer and died in 1970, four months short of his 50th birthday.Irwin "Sonny" Fox – The first Challenge host was also known at the time for co-hosting the CBS children's travelogue Let's Take a Trip (Fox described it as "Taking two children on sort of an electronic field trip every week–live, remote location, no audience, no sponsors"), but his fame rests predominantly on his eight-year (1959–1967) tour as the suave, congenial and dryly witty fourth host of New York's Sunday morning children's learn-and-laugh marathon, Wonderama. Fox hosted Way Out Games (1976–1977), a Saturday-morning series for CBS, then later spent a year (1977–1978) running children's programming for NBC and eventually became a chairman of the board for Population Communications International, a nonprofit dedicated to "technical assistance, research and training consultation to governments, NGOs and foundations on a wide range of social marketing and communications initiatives", for which he is still an honorary chairman. Fox has also been a board chairman for the National Academy of Television Arts and Sciences.Patty Duke – A child star (thanks to her Broadway portrayal of Helen Keller) when she appeared on Challenge, she eventually testified to Congressional investigators – and broke to tears when she admitted she'd been coached to speak falsely, an incident Sonny Fox described when interviewed for the PBS program reviewing the quiz scandals. Duke survived to become a television star (The Patty Duke Show) in the early-to-mid-'60s, before moving on to more film and television work (including a memorable role in Valley of the Dolls), becoming an activist in the Screen Actors Guild, writing two memoirs (Call Me Anna and A Brilliant Madness) describing her troubled child acting career and her lifelong battle with manic depression, and becoming an advocate for better protection and benefits for child actors. She died on March 29, 2016, from Sepsis, resulting from a ruptured Intestine.Charles Revson – Inspired by cosmetics competitor Hazel Bishop (whose sponsoring of This Is Your Life provided big sales to Bishop) to think about television sponsorship in the first place, Revson was never investigated in his own right for his role in the quiz show scandals despite testifying (as did his brother, Martin) before Congress when the scandals broke in earnest. The cosmetics empire he founded, however, continued its success – and continued to sponsor television programming – for many years after the scandals faded away. Known as a hard-driving, hard-driven perfectionist whose overbearing manner usually alienated even his closest business partners, Revson's success left him a billionaire when he died in 1975. His charitable foundation has since given over $145 million in grants to schools, hospitals, and service organizations in various Jewish communities.Dr. Joyce Brothers – Only the second contestant to win the show's big prize (after expertly thwarting numerous attempts to bump her from the show because Martin Revson was said to have disliked her and doubted her credibility as a boxing expert), Brothers has enjoyed the most enduring fame and media success among anyone who rose to prominence by way of Question. Her championship as a boxing expert led to an invitation to become a commentator for CBS' telecast of a championship boxing match between Sugar Ray Robinson and Carmen Basilio. In August 1958, shortly after she earned her license to practice psychology in New York, Brothers was given her own television program, first locally in New York and then in national syndication. Making numerous television and radio appearances as a psychologist, not to mention numerous television comedy roles, Brothers has also written a long-running syndicated advice column in newspapers and magazines, which was used as a source for some questions on the 1998–2004 revival of Hollywood Squares. She is still considered, arguably, the first media psychologist. She died from respiratory failure on May 13, 2013 at age 85.Ralph Story''' – He became the much-loved host of Ralph Story's Los Angeles (1964–1970), still considered the highest-rated, best-loved local show in Los Angeles television history. Story has also hosted A.M. Los Angeles and was the narrator for the ABC series Alias Smith and Jones in 1972–1973. He died on September 26, 2006 at the age of 86.

Revivals
Selected PBS outlets showed surviving kinescopes of the original Question in Summer 1976, as a run-up to a new version of the show called The $128,000 Question, which ran for two years. The first season was hosted by Mike Darrow and produced at the Ed Sullivan Theater in New York City, while the second was produced at Global Television Network in Toronto, Ontario, Canada and hosted by Alex Trebek.

In 1999, television producer Michael Davies attempted to revive Question as The $640,000 Question for ABC, before abandoning that project in favor of producing an American version of the British game show Who Wants to Be a Millionaire?. Millionaire has a very similar format to The $64,000 Question – 15 questions in which the contestant's money roughly doubles with each correct question until reaching the top prize. However, the questions in Millionaire are of a broader variety than Question's one-category line of questioning and have a different category for each question, all questions are multiple choice, contestants are allowed to leave the game with their money after a question is revealed but before it is answered, and Millionaire offers three chances for help (called "lifelines"), which were not present in Question.

In 2000, responding to the success of Millionaire, CBS bought the rights to the property in a reported effort to produce another revival attempt, The $64,000 Question (with a top prize of $1,024,000), to be hosted by sportscaster Greg Gumbel. Because of format issues similar to those encountered by Davies for ABC, this version was never broadcast.

United States broadcast historyThe $64,000 Question– CBS television; June 7, 1955– June 24, 1958 (Tuesday 10:00p.m.); September 14– November 9, 1958 (Sunday 10:00p.m.). Simulcast on CBS Radio from October 4 to November 29, 1955.The $64,000 Challenge– CBS television; April 8, 1956– September 14, 1958; Sunday 10:00p.m.The $128,000 Question– syndicated weekly television, September 18, 1976– September 1978.

International versions

Australia
A similar version of The $64,000 Question was successful in Australia from 1960 to 1971 on Seven Network. Initially called Coles £3000 Question, the show changed its name to Coles $6000 Question on February 14, 1966 (the date Australia converted to decimal currency) and was sponsored for most of its run by Coles Stores. In July 1971, Coles dropped its sponsorship and the show became The $7000 Question. It was hosted by Malcolm Searle (1960–1963) and Roland Strong (1963–1971).

Denmark
A Danish version of the show called Kvit eller dobbelt was made in Denmark. The show originally aired from 1957–1959, with a top prize of 10,000 Danish crowns. It was revived in 1984, then again in 1990 and again in 1999. The latest revival in 2013 was aimed at kids and also included kids as participants.

United Kingdom
There were three derived versions in the UK: earlier, The 64,000 Question, Double Your Money (see above) and later, The $64,000 Question.

Italy
The Italian version of this quiz was Lascia o raddoppia? (1955–1959). The prize money doubled from 2,560,000 lire to 5,120,000 lire.

Mexico
The Mexican version, El Gran Premio de los 64,000 pesos lasted from 1956 to 1994 with some interruptions, changes of name to compensate peso devaluation, and changes of TV network. Most of the time it was hosted by Pedro Ferriz. A movie was made in which Ferriz asks questions to a character played by Sara García, known then as "Mexican Cinema's Granny".

Poland
The Polish version of this quiz was Wielka gra ("The Great Game," 1962–2006). Initially the rules and the studio set-up matched the original's, but in 1975 both were changed by Wojciech Pijanowski, creator, producer, writer, and/or host of many quiz shows in Poland in the late 20th century, as the isolation booth was abandoned and a large turntable was added in the center of the studio floor, displaying the prize amount for each round, upon which the envelopes containing the questions were placed. The categories became more specific (e.g., Mozart—life and compositions, Muslim conquests in the 7th–8th centuries), were limited to art, history (most categories), geography, and zoology, and were now chosen by players during the elimination rounds.

After 1975, the game had the following rounds: 
The first round was a duel between two players; it consisted of up to 20 questions and lasted until one player had gotten two questions wrong. Players wore headphones playing loud music in order not to hear during each other's turns.
The second round was an "exam," in which the player who had won the duel now had to answer three questions from each of three experts in a category. The player could make up to two mistakes. If successful, the player then received a prize.
In the third, fourth, and final rounds, the player drew envelopes with questions from the big turntable, with the prize doubling each round. The grand prize changed over the years: primarily it was 25,000 zlotys (about equal to the average annual wage); later it was 40,000 zlotys (ca. $12,000).
The hosts were Ryszard Serafinowicz (1962–1969), Joanna Rostocka (1969–1973, previously Serafinowicz's co-host), Janusz Budzyński (1973–1975) and Stanisława Ryster (1975–2006).

Although the show was cancelled due to low viewership, the cancellation was controversial because of how highly regarded it was by many people, especially those who were still watching it, and because some games that were planned or already in progress were not completed.

There were plans to revive the show in 2016 as Większa gra ("The Greater Game") in an altered format, but eventually those plans were cancelled.

Sweden
The Swedish version of this quiz was Kvitt eller dubbelt (1957–1994).

Connections
Spoofed inThe Honeymooners: "The $99,000 Answer" (first aired January 28, 1956); Ralph becomes a contestant on a quiz show, but nervously answers his first question incorrectly.The Phil Silvers Show: "It's for the Birds". Bilko discovers one of his platoon is an expert on birds. He signs Pvt. Honnegan (played by Fred Gwynne) up for The $64,000 Question TV show. First broadcast on September 25, 1956.Fox-Terror (Looney Tunes short, 1957) The Jack Benny Program: Hal March Show (#8.3) (1957). Host Hal March appears in Jack Benny's version of the game show.

In Popular Culture
The phrase the $64,000 question is an idiom and is routinely usedhttps://www.nasdaq.com/articles/the-%2464000-question-facing-ethereum%3A-will-it-really-be-better-after-the-merge  as a way of saying the most important question''. It is derived from the fact that the ultimate question on the show was indeed, the $64,000 question.

References

External links

Interview with former Quiz Show Host

CBS original programming
CBS Radio programs
NBC radio programs
1940s American radio programs
1950s American radio programs
Radio programs adapted into television shows
1955 American television series debuts
1958 American television series endings
1950s American game shows
Black-and-white American television shows
English-language television shows
Entertainment scandals
Nielsen ratings winners
Television series based on radio series
Television series by CBS Studios
Television shows filmed in New York City
Television controversies in the United States
1960s Australian game shows
1970s Australian game shows